Kenichi Tanaka is a Japanese mixed martial artist and referee. He competed in the Bantamweight and Featherweight divisions. Tanaka is one of the earliest Satoru Sayama trainees under Super Tiger Gym, and was the inaugural Shooto Lightweight 65 kg (143.3 lb) Champion. He later lost the title to Kazuhiro Sakamoto. 

Tanaka refereed Seikendo events.

Tanaka is a former trainer at Shooting Gym Tsudanuma and founded and currently owns Super Tiger Gym Tanaka Juku.

Championships and Accomplishments
Shooto
Shooto Lightweight 65 kg (143.3 lb) Championship (One time)

Mixed martial arts record

|-
| Draw
| align=center| 6-4-3
| Hideki Ogawa
| Draw
| Daidojuku - WARS 5
| 
| align=center| 3
| align=center| 3:00
| Japan
| 
|-
| Loss
| align=center| 6-4-2
| Kyuhei Ueno
| Decision (unanimous)
| Shooto - Vale Tudo Access 3
| 
| align=center| 5
| align=center| 3:00
| Tokyo, Japan
| 
|-
| Win
| align=center| 6-3-2
| Mamoru Okochi
| Submission (arm-triangle choke)
| Shooto - Vale Tudo Access 1
| 
| align=center| 1
| align=center| 2:51
| Tokyo, Japan
| 
|-
| Draw
| align=center| 5-3-2
| Noboru Asahi
| Draw
| Shooto - Shooto
| 
| align=center| 5
| align=center| 3:00
| Tokyo, Japan
| 
|-
| Win
| align=center| 5-3-1
| Hiroyuki Kanno
| Submission (kimura)
| Shooto - Shooto
| 
| align=center| 3
| align=center| 0:00
| Tokyo, Japan
| 
|-
| Draw
| align=center| 4-3-1
| Noboru Asahi
| Draw
| Shooto - Shooto
| 
| align=center| 5
| align=center| 3:00
| Tokyo, Japan
| 
|-
| Loss
| align=center| 4-3
| Kazuhiro Sakamoto
| Decision (unanimous)
| Shooto - Shooto
| 
| align=center| 5
| align=center| 3:00
| Tokyo, Japan
| 
|-
| Loss
| align=center| 4-2
| Hiroyuki Kanno
| Decision (unanimous)
| Shooto - Shooto
| 
| align=center| 5
| align=center| 3:00
| Tokyo, Japan
| 
|-
| Win
| align=center| 4-1
| Kazuhiro Sakamoto
| Submission (kimura)
| Shooto - Shooto
| 
| align=center| 2
| align=center| 2:37
| Tokyo, Japan
| 
|-
| Win
| align=center| 3-1
| Kazuhiro Sakamoto
| Submission (armbar)
| Shooto - Shooto
| 
| align=center| 1
| align=center| 0:00
| Tokyo, Japan
| 
|-
| Win
| align=center| 2-1
| Tetsuo Yokoyama
| Submission (achilles lock)
| Shooto - Shooto
| 
| align=center| 1
| align=center| 0:21
| Tokyo, Japan
| 
|-
| Loss
| align=center| 1-1
| Kazuhiro Sakamoto
| Submission (armbar)
| Shooto - Shooto
| 
| align=center| 1
| align=center| 1:30
| Tokyo, Japan
| 
|-
| Win
| align=center| 1-0
| Makoto Ozaki
| Submission (armbar)
| Shooto - Shooto
| 
| align=center| 3
| align=center| 0:00
| Tokyo, Japan
|

See also
List of male mixed martial artists

References

External links
 
 Kenichi Tanaka at mixedmartialarts.com
 Kenichi Tanaka at fightmatrix.com

Japanese male mixed martial artists
Bantamweight mixed martial artists
Featherweight mixed martial artists
Living people
Year of birth missing (living people)